Christopher Anthony Cook (born 5 May 1979) is an English former competitive swimmer who swam for Great Britain in the Olympics, world championships and European championships, and competed for England in the Commonwealth Games.

Cook specialises in the breaststroke, and took gold in the 50 and 100 metre finals representing England at the 2006 Commonwealth Games in Melbourne. He has also competed for Great Britain at the 2004 Summer Olympics in Athens.

Living in Wallsend, he was coached by Ian Oliver at the City of Newcastle Swimming Club. He competed at the Olympic Games in 2004 and 2008.

Personal bests and records held

References

External links
British Swimming athlete profile
British Olympic Association athlete profile
Cook's bio from the 2008 Olympics.

He is currently on a UK school tour.

1979 births
Living people
Sportspeople from South Shields
English male swimmers
Male breaststroke swimmers
Commonwealth Games gold medallists for England
Commonwealth Games silver medallists for England
Swimmers at the 2004 Summer Olympics
Swimmers at the 2006 Commonwealth Games
Swimmers at the 2008 Summer Olympics
Olympic swimmers of Great Britain
Medalists at the FINA World Swimming Championships (25 m)
Commonwealth Games medallists in swimming
Universiade medalists in swimming
Universiade silver medalists for Great Britain
Medalists at the 2003 Summer Universiade
Medallists at the 2006 Commonwealth Games